Leszek Tadeusz Biały (22 March 1940 – 9 October 2022) was a Polish politician. A member of the Democratic Left Alliance, he served in the Sejm from 1991 to 1993.

Biały died on 9 October 2022, at the age of 82.

References

1940 births
2022 deaths
Polish educators
20th-century Polish politicians
Democratic Left Alliance politicians
Members of the Polish Sejm 1991–1993
University of Warsaw alumni
People from Płock County